The Aero was a Czechoslovak automobile company that produced a variety of models between 1929 and 1947 by a well-known aircraft and car-body company owned by Dr. Kabes in Prague-Vysocany. Now Aero Vodochody produces aircraft only.

Type 10 
The original Aero model, the Type 500 or Type 10 was a small cyclecar launched in 1928. Drive was to the rear axle through a 3-speed gearbox to a back axle without differential. The Type 10 was sold with a choice of body styles; roadster, cabriolet and coupé, all with two seats in the front and one in the rear. Production ran for four years, ending in 1932 with 1,358 built.

Type 18 

With improved four-wheel brakes, the Type 18 came as a 3-seater roadster and 4-seat saloon, made using steel-covered timber-framed coachwork. 2,615 Type 18s were built before manufacturing ceased in 1934.

Type 20 
Production lasted two years and ceased in 1934 after 2,546 were built.

Type 30 

In 1934 the Type 30 was announced with a 998 cc  twin-cylinder engine, front-wheel drive and all independent suspension. The car could reach . The Type 30 was the most successful Aero model, and production reached 7,780 before manufacturing ended in 1940. Another 500 were produced post-war with a new radiator design but was stopped in 1947 when the company was nationalised.

Type 50 

The last, and largest, Aero model was the Type 50 announced in 1936 and manufactured until 1942. The front-wheel-drive model had a 1997 cc four-cylinder  two-stroke engine with twin alloy cylinder head and was capable of reaching . 1,205 were made until the company closed.

750 Pony 
The 750 Pony is a small two-seater convertible with only 2 models built as prototypes in 1941 and was intended for post war producing, but nationalisation of the company ended the plan.  It was powered by a 745 cc engine producing .

References

External links 

 Aero Cars Czech Republic
 Aero club homepage (in Slovak)
 Aero car pictures
 Aero Roadster picture from 'FineCars'
 pictures of an Aero 50 restoration story
 Aero veteran club de

Motor vehicle manufacturers of Czechoslovakia
Defunct motor vehicle manufacturers of Czechoslovakia
Vehicle manufacturing companies established in 1929
Vehicle manufacturing companies disestablished in 1947
1929 establishments in Czechoslovakia
1947 disestablishments in Czechoslovakia